Auye (Auwje) and Dao (Maniwo) are the two dialects of a Papuan language spoken in the Paniai lakes region of the Indonesian province of Papua.

References

Paniai Lakes languages